The Temple Hills-Marlow Heights Line, designated Routes H11, H12, and H13, is a daily bus route operated by the Washington Metropolitan Area Transit Authority between Naylor Road station of the Green Line of the Washington Metro and Heather Hill Apartment Complex in Temple Hills, Maryland, via the Iverson Mall and the Marlow Heights Shopping Center. The line operates 35 minutes Monday-Friday and 60 minutes on Saturdays & Sundays. Trips are roughly 30 minutes long.

Background
Routes H11, H12, and H13 operates between Naylor Road station and Heather Hills Apartment Complex in Temple Hills, Maryland mostly along Fisher Road, Temple Hills Road, St. Barnabas Road, and Branch Avenue connecting Hillcrest Heights, Silver Hill, Marlow Heights, and Temple Hills. Routes H11 and H13 operates during the weekday peak-hours while route H12 operates daily except in the weekday peak direction. Route H11 operates in the weekday peak direction while route H13 operates in the non weekday peak direction.

Route H11 operates to Princeton Estates Apartments, routes H12 and H13 skips Princeton Estates Apartments, and H11 and H12 operates inside Hillcrest Heights, Maryland while the H13 remains on Branch Avenue.

Routes H11, H12, and H13 currently operates out of Andrews Federal Center division since June 23, 2019. It formally operated out of Landover and Southern Avenue divisions at one point.

H11 Stops

H12 Stops

H13 Stops

History
Routes H11, H12, & H14 initially started off as streetcar lines in 1939 which operated under the Washington Marlboro & Annapolis Motor Lines Inc. (WM&A) between Federal Triangle in Downtown Washington DC and the Heather Hills Apartment Complex in Temple Hills, Maryland via Iverson Mall and the Marlow Heights Shopping Center. The line mostly operated along Pennsylvania Avenue, Independence Avenue, 7th Street, Branch Avenue, St. Barnabas Road, Temple Hill Road, and Fisher Road. Route H11 would make diversion from St. Barnabas Road to serve the Princeton Estates Apartment Complex in Marlow Heights. 

Routes H11 and H12 would operate weekly while the H14 would only operate during weekday peak-hours. All three routes were later converted into bus routes during the 1950s and eventually acquired by WMATA on February 4, 1973.

1978 Changes 
On September 25, 1978, more than a year after the Potomac Avenue station opened, routes H11, H12, and H14 were all truncated to only operate between Potomac Avenue station and Temple Hills (Heather Hills Apartments), instead of operating to Federal Triangle in Downtown Washington DC. Service to Downtown was replaced by the Blue Line.

2001 Changes
On January 13, 2001 when Naylor Road station opened, routes H11 and H12 were truncated even further to only operate up to Naylor Road station and Heather Hills Apartments, instead of operating to Potomac Avenue station . The segment of H11 and H12's routing between Naylor Road and Potomac Avenue stations were taken over by routes 35 and 36.

Route H14 was discontinued and renamed H13. Route H13 would also operate between Naylor Road and Heather Hills Apartments during the weekday peak hours except skipping the diversion into Hillcrest Heights similar to the old H14.

2010 Proposed Changes
In 2010 during WMATA's FY2011 budget year, WMATA proposed to reroute the H11, H12, and H13 to Carriage Hill Apartments via Curtis Drive during the weekday and Saturday hours in order to replace routes C12 and C14 which were proposed to be discontinued.

2017 Changes
On June 25, 2017, weekday peak-hour service frequency was reduced from 20 minutes to 25 minutes.

2020 Proposed Changes
On September 26, 2020, WMATA proposed to eliminate all route H11 and H13 service, reduce route H12 service to only every 60 minutes, and eliminate most Sunday service to only operate between 11:20 AM and 3:20 PM. Route H11 has not operated since March 13, 2020 while route H13 has not operated since March 17, 2020 due to Metro's response to the COVID-19 pandemic. However on March 14, 2021, route H12 Sunday service was restored.

References

H11